Song Nam-hyang (born 6 May 1996) is a North Korean diver. Her main events are 10m platform and 10m synchronized platform. She competed for the 2014 Asian Games at both women's 10m platform and synchronized platform. At the 2014 Asian Games, She won the silver medal of women's 10m synchronized platform with her partner Kim Un-hyang and came the 6th at the individual event. At the 2015 World Aquatics Championships, she won the bronze medal of women's 10m synchronized platform with her partner Kim Un-hyang. At women's 10m platform, she came the 10th.

References

North Korean female divers
1996 births
Living people
Asian Games medalists in diving
Divers at the 2014 Asian Games
World Aquatics Championships medalists in diving
Asian Games silver medalists for North Korea
Medalists at the 2014 Asian Games
21st-century North Korean women